T.E.L.I... is the third studio album by Polish heavy metal band Hunter. It was released on May 30, 2005 by Metal Mind Productions.

A music videos have been made for the songs "Pomiędzy niebem, a piekłem" and "T.E.L.I." directed by Marcin Klinger and Tomasz Mączka, respectively.
 
The album landed at number 7 on Polish Albums Chart, and dropped out four weeks later.

Track listing

Credits

References 

2005 albums
Hunter (band) albums
Metal Mind Productions albums
Polish-language albums